Extreme Rising was a professional wrestling promotion based in Philadelphia, Pennsylvania from 2012 to 2014. Former employees in Extreme Rising consisted of professional wrestlers, managers, play-by-play and color commentators, announcers, interviewers and referees.

Alumni

Male wrestlers

Stables and tag teams

Managers and valets

Commentators and interviewers

Other personnel

References
General

Specific

External links

Extreme Rising alumni at Cagematch.net

Extreme Rising alumni